Bugatti Rimac is a Joint Venture headquartered in Sveta Nedelja, Croatia, known for the car brands Bugatti and Rimac. The two brands were united under the business decision of Porsche, giving control of Bugatti to Mate Rimac and in return receive more share in Rimac Group, which includes Rimac Technology, a company that develops batteries and powertrains.

Rimac Automobili and Bugatti Automobiles will continue to operate as separate brands and manufacturers, retaining their production facilities in Zagreb, Croatia and Molsheim, France, as well as distribution channels. The global headquarters of Bugatti Rimac is located in the previous headquarters of Rimac Automobili in Sveta Nedelja near Zagreb. In time, it will move to the announced Rimac Campus of 200,000 square meters, which is also located in Sveta Nedelja, and which should be opened in 2023.

Bugatti Rimac is already a company with 435 employees, 300 of them in Sveta Nedelja and another 135 in Molsheim in France. The Rimac Group adds that their work will be supported by 180 people at the location of Bugatti Engineering in Wolfsburg, which will be part of the German branch of Bugatti Rimac.

On 20 August 2022, Bugatti Rimac presented its first joint car a Bugatti W16 Mistral. The Mistral will be a roadster with an 8.0-liter W16 engine with 1,600 hp and 1,600 NM of torque. It will be produced in 99 units and worth 5 million euros each.

References

 
Battery electric vehicle manufacturers
Sports car manufacturers
Luxury motor vehicle manufacturers
Vehicle manufacturing companies established in 2021
Croatian brands
2021 establishments in Croatia
Zagreb County
Car manufacturers of Croatia